Villeda is a surname. Notable people with the surname include:

Mauricio Villeda (born 1948), Honduran attorney and leader of the Liberal Party of Honduras
Ramón Villeda Bermúdez (1937–2012), Honduran veterinarian and politician
Ramón Villeda Morales (1909–1971), Honduran politician and President of Honduras

See also 
Ramón Villeda Morales International Airport, is an airport in Honduras
Ramón Villeda Morales (municipality), is a municipality in the Honduran department
Rudolfo Infante and Anna Villeda, is a Mexican-American serial killer pair